Patrick Mathias, popularly known as Password, is a Nigerian record producer, singer and songwriter. He is best known for co-writing the song "Gobe" with Davido, which peaked at number 1 on MTV Base's Official Naija Top Ten Chart. He won MTN's SongStar contest with Don Jazzy. Password has continued to make his mark in the Nigerian music and movie industry and as a producer and songwriter, he has worked with multi-nationals and several A-list artistes whose songs are rated hit songs within and outside the country.

He was also the Creative Director for Ultima Productions/960 Music which was a partnership formed for the funding, marketing, distribution and promotions of the MTN Project Fame Winners. His versatility and dynamism in Music was influenced by a wide range of eclectic music sources, from hip hop to RnB, country music, African folk, reggae and dancehall.

To him, music is spiritual and every sound communicates something that words alone cannot convey if you pay attention long enough. It helped him get away from some unpleasant experiences during his early years, it was his loyal companion. His Sensitivity to the Spirit of God influences what he puts out and this made him realize he's been entrusted with so much more especially for the next generation, therefore, he's deliberate about whatever he appends his signature to. 
He is the Founder of a content hub known as Kingdom Pop Culture (KPC) for Creatives for the sole purpose of conscious content creation. As we know, we have a universally diverse youth who are now unconventional in their choices of expression, so KPC seeks to equip them with all that is required for the marketplace. As a multi-talented creative himself, Password seeks to use all that he is being gifted with to influence the world, one individual at a time.

He has been credited for his work on numerous songs, including "Mercy" by Praiz and "Born Champion" by General Pype. His popular gospel hit song "Amaghimo" became a global anthem shortly after its release, and it has also peaked in various music charts across Africa.

His debut album The Call was released in 2021, and its features song collaborations with Agent Snypa, Testimony Jaga, Ada Ehi and Protek Illasheva.

Discography

Albums 

 Bigiano - Shayo Master (2009) Producer
 Password - The Call (2021) Producer, Songwriter and Performer

Singles 

 Password "Amaghimo" (2016) Producer, Songwriter and Performer
 Davido - "Gobe" (2012) Writer, Co-Producer
 Presh featuring Tiwa Savage - "I No Dey Lie" (2014)
 Praiz - "Mercy" (2013) Writer and Producer
 Password - "All About You" (2013)
 General Pype - "Champion" (2011)
 Darey featuring 9ice and Jesse Jagz - "Style Na Style" (Remix) (2009)
 Darey - "Close" (Double Dare Vol.1&2 (Heartbeat)) (2011) Writer and Producer
 Darey - "Maybe" (Double Dare Vol.1&2 (Heartbeat)) (2011)
 Geoffrey Oji - "Bursting My Brain" (2015)
 Darey - "Cure the World" (Double Dare Vol.1&2 (Heartbeat)) (2011) Writer and Co-Producer
 Ada Ehi featuring Buchi Atuonwu - "Congratulations" Producer
 KPC featuring Henrisoul - "On Your Mind" (2021) Producer
 Praiz "No Pain" (2020) - Produced and Co-Written by Password
 Praiz "Odo Yewu" (2020) - Written and Produced by Password
 Praiz "Ring On It" (2020) feat. Olamide - Produced and Co-written by Password
 Praiz "Somebody" (2020) - Produced and Co-Written by Password
Praiz "Madu" (2020) - Written and Produced by Password
 Praiz "Whatchu Gon Do" (2020) - Written and Produced by Password
 Jeff Akoh "I Do" (2018) Producer and Writer
 Darey "Paranoia" (2020) - Co-Written by Password
 Darey "Trying" (2020) - Written by Password
 Darey "Awele" (2020) -Co-Written by Password
 Darey "Black and Beautiful" (2020) - Written by Password
 Darey "Inseparable" (2020) - Co-Written by Password
 Darey "Water Fire (2020) - Written by Password
 Bigiano "Chiquito" (2020)- Written and Produced by Password
 Chinyere Udoma "Oza" (2019) - Produced and Co-Written by Password
 Chinyere Udoma "Overdose" (2019) - Produced by Password
 Agent Snypa "Unconditional" (2017) Producer and Co-writer
 Snypa "Spotlight" (2020) - Produced and Co-Written by Password 
 TB1 "You Deserve It All" (2019) -Produced by Password
 Soltune "It is Working" (2019) -Produced and Co-Written by Password
 Fido Cleff "Na You" (2020) - Produced and Co-Written by Password 
 Victor Ike "Omewoya" (2020) -Produced and Co-Written by Password
 Crix B "Kpakam" (2020) - Written and Produced by Password
 JerryK "Holy Ghost Flight" (2019) - Produced and Co-Written by Password
 Michael Pounds "Komaleto" - Written and Produced by Password
 Geoffrey "Sorry Sir" (2017) Producer and Co-writer
 Willicino "Ayanda" (2017) Producer and Co-writer
 Willicino "Ayanda remix" ft Timaya (2017) Producer and Writer
 Michael Pounds "Faithful God" - Written and Produced by Password
 Michael Pounds "Baba" - Written and Produced by Password
 Michael Pounds "Courts" - Produced and Co-written by Password
 Michael Pounds "Inkosi Yamakosi" - Written and Produced by Password
 Michael Pounds "Praise My Way Through"- Co-Written and Produced by Password
 Geoffrey "Monalisa" (2015) Writer and Producer

Movie Soundtracks 
 Hoodrush (2012) 
 Journey to Self (2012)

Awards 

 Best Movie Soundtrack at the 2013 Nollywood Movies Awards for Hoodrush Soundtrack.
New Act of The Year at the 2019 Loveworld International Music Awards(LIMA) for "Amaghimo"

References

Year of birth missing (living people)
Living people
People from Calabar
Nigerian male singer-songwriters
Nigerian singer-songwriters
Nigerian hip hop record producers
Nigerian hip hop musicians